William Ralph Emerson (March 11, 1833 – November 23, 1917) was an American architect.  He partnered with Carl Fehmer in Emerson and Fehmer.

Early life and education 
A cousin of Ralph Waldo Emerson, William was born in Alton, Illinois, and trained in the office of Jonathan Preston (1801–1888), an architect–builder in Boston. He formed an architectural partnership with Preston (1857–1861), practiced alone for two years, then partnered with Carl Fehmer (1864–1873).

He is best known for his Shingle Style houses and inns, many of them in Bar Harbor, Maine. He worked with fellow Boston designer Frederick Law Olmsted on the creation of the National Zoo in Washington, D.C., designing several of the zoo's first buildings.

Emerson was a friend of the Boston painter William Morris Hunt, who painted a portrait of Emerson's son Ralph, shown at an exhibition of Hunt's work at the Boston Museum of Fine Arts in 1880.

Emerson died in Milton, Massachusetts.

Personal life 
On September 15, 1873 he married Sylvia Hathaway Watson.

Selected works
 1869 Sanford-Covell Villa Marina , 72 Washington Street, Newport, Rhode Island
 1869 Marsh-Billings-Rockefeller Mansion renovation, Woodstock, Vermont
 1875 Massachusetts Homeopathic Hospital, Harrison Avenue, Boston, Massachusetts
 1878 Eustis Estate, Canton Avenue, Milton, Massachusetts
 1878 Summer cottage of Boston painter William Morris Hunt, Magnolia, Massachusetts
 1879 Redwood, C. J. Morrill House, Bar Harbor, Maine
 1881 Boston Art Club, 150 Newbury Street, Boston, Massachusetts
 1887 Saint Jude's Episcopal Church, Seal Harbor, Mount Desert, Maine
 1887 Saint Margaret's Roman Catholic Church, Beverly Farms, Massachusetts
 1887 Tianderah, stone and shingle residence, Gilbertsville, New York; Listed on the National Historic Register, November 2, 1978 #78001894
 1888 Fitz Cottage, Jackson, New Hampshire 
 1889 William James House, 95 Irving Street, Cambridge, Massachusetts
 1890 The Reading Room, now part of the Bar Harbor Inn, Bar Harbor, Maine
 1890–1892 The Hotel Claremont, Claremont, New Hampshire
 1896 Felsted, a cottage for Frederick Law Olmsted, Deer Isle, Maine

References

 The Architecture of William Ralph Emerson, catalog by Cynthia Zaitzevsky with photography by Myron Miller, Fogg Art Museum, Cambridge, Mass. 1969.

External links

1833 births
1917 deaths
Architects from Illinois
Architects from Boston
People from Alton, Illinois
People from Milton, Massachusetts